Brown County Courthouse Historic District is a historic courthouse and national historic district located at Nashville, Brown County, Indiana.  It encompasses three contributing buildings: the courthouse, Old Log Jail, and the Historical Society Museum Building.  The Brown County Courthouse was built in 1873–1874, and is a two-story, Greek Revival style brick building.  It has a gable roof and two-tiered, flat-roofed frame tower.  The Old Log Jail was built in 1879, and is a small two-story log building.  It measures 12 feet by 20 feet, and was used as a jail until 1922.  The Historical Society Museum Building, or Brown County Community Building, is a two-story, rectangular log building.  It was moved to its present location in 1936–1937.  The Works Progress Administration funded the reconstruction and remodeling of the building.

It was listed on the National Register of Historic Places in 1983.

References

External links
Brown County Historical Society website

Works Progress Administration in Indiana
History museums in Indiana
County courthouses in Indiana
Courthouses on the National Register of Historic Places in Indiana
Historic districts on the National Register of Historic Places in Indiana
Greek Revival architecture in Indiana
Government buildings completed in 1874
Buildings and structures in Brown County, Indiana
National Register of Historic Places in Brown County, Indiana
1874 establishments in Indiana